The Women's team épée open at the 2012 Summer Paralympics in London took place on 8 September 2012 at ExCeL Exhibition Centre.

Schedule 
All times are British Summer Time

Competition format 
The tournament run in a knockout format. Teams progress through the draw until the finals, which decide the winners of the gold medals.

Results

External links 
 Wheelchair Fencing - Schedule & Results 
 Women's Team - Category Open 

Wheelchair fencing at the 2012 Summer Paralympics
Para